City Montessori School, Gomti Nagar (CMS GN) Branch, Lucknow is a private school that offers education up to the level of under-graduation, in Lucknow, India. CMS GN is a co-educational, English Medium institution affiliated to ICSE Board, New Delhi. The streams offered are Science and Commerce. The school has been ranked 6th in the "most respected secondary schools" in India list compiled by IMRB in 2007.

Organization
CMS GN comprises four sections:

The Pre-Primary Section
CMS has adopted the Montessori method of preschool education. The Pre-Primary section admits boys and girls between the ages of 2 and 5 as follows:
Montessori: 2 to 3 years of age (Play Group)
Nursery: 4 years of age
Kindergarten: 5 years of age

The Primary Section
The Primary Section consists of Grades I to V.

The Junior Section
The Junior Section consists of Grades VI-VIII.

The Senior Section
The Senior Section consists of Grades IX-XII.

HOUSES :

1. Love house- green
2. Peace house- blue
3. Hope house- red
4. Unity house- yellow

Traditions

Morning prayer assembly
Students participate in morning assembly, held in the school's auditorium and lasting about half an hour. It consists of the recital of devotional songs and prayers. A group of students conducts the assembly and presents virtue-talks and inspiring speeches and stories as well. There are discussions on how to bring about world peace.

Class presentations
Class presentations showcase individual talent. Every child of the class gets an opportunity to face an audience in a 2-2½ hour long ensemble of dances, songs, cultural presentations, skits and debates. The longest class presentation was held by class 7-B and class 7-D under the class teachers Mrs. Reema Bhattacharya and Mrs. Azra Respectively in 2016. The Presentation lasted 5 hours and 30 minutes

Enrichment classes 
With the aim of adapting the curriculum to individual needs the school runs enrichment classes. These are held after school hours and consist of small groups where discussion, problem-solving, reinforcement of learning and close teacher student interaction takes place.

Student Council
To develop leadership qualities and a sense of responsibility in children the school has a head boy/head girl, literary in charge, sports captain, discipline in charge, captains, vice-captains and prefects who are responsible for discipline, neatness, and organization of functions.

The school also has an Editorial board which includes the literary incharges headed by a teacher in charge who is responsible for organizing literary related competitions. 

School Editorial board: Mrs. Sadaf Fatima, Shreya Yadav, Samriddhi, Vandita Gupta and Aryan Abhay Verma.

Extracurricular activities
CMS GN students participate in National and International competitions including International Robotics Olympiads, International Quality Circle Conventions, International Astronomy Olympiads, Environmental workshops, International Science festivals like Quanta, Macfair, Cofas, Celesta, SAARC Youth Festival, World Peace Festival, Children's International Summer Village (CISV) Camps, International School to School Exchange (ISSE) programmes, National Mathematics Olympiads, National Talent Search Examination and National Choral Singing Competitions.

OLYMPUS
A 3-day cultural and literary festival is organised in the school in which the students get a chance to show their talents through different events.

CMSMUN
CMS model united nations started in the year 2016 and is a renowned and prestigious Model UN conferences in the country.

During the second wave of Covid-19, the school conducted a student-led international cultural event Abhyuthanam, and literary event Wordcraft, both under the combined banner of 'Euphoria', to foster feelings of unity during the testing times. This received a lot of positive responses from public. This was conducted virtually, keeping in mind the safety protocol during the time. Over 5 countries and 25 schools participated in this event.

Gallery

References

External links 
 
 https://web.archive.org/web/20080602064424/http://www.cmseducation.org/branches/gomti.html
 https://web.archive.org/web/20090107112856/http://www.cmseducation.org/branches/gomti/index.html
 https://web.archive.org/web/20080828125116/http://www.cmspdcc.org/
 https://web.archive.org/web/20080908092555/http://www.guinnessworldrecords.com/records/amazing_feats/mass_participation/largest_school_by_pupils.aspx
 http://www.cmseducation.org/cms_site/special_projects/health_edu/index.htm

Montessori schools in India
Primary schools in Uttar Pradesh
High schools and secondary schools in Uttar Pradesh
Private schools in Lucknow
Educational institutions established in 1991
1991 establishments in Uttar Pradesh